"Don't Dream It's Over" is a song by rock band Crowded House, recorded for their 1986 self-titled debut studio album. The song was composed and written by New Zealand frontman Neil Finn, and released in October 1986 as the fourth single from the album.

"Don't Dream It's Over" became the band's biggest international hit, reaching  2 on the Billboard Hot 100 in the United States in April 1987. "Don't Dream It's Over" was also a great success in Finn's native country of New Zealand, where it reached Number 1. It also topped the charts in Canada, while in Australia it peaked at No. 8. In continental Europe, it reached No. 6 in Norway, No. 7 in the Netherlands, and No. 13 in Germany. At the 1986 Countdown Australian Music Awards the song was nominated for three awards, winning Best Video.

"Don't Dream It's Over" is written and composed in the key of E-flat major and is set in the time signature of common time with a tempo of 82 beats per minute.

"Don't Dream It's Over" was prominently featured in the 1994 miniseries adaptation of Stephen King's novel The Stand. The song has also been recorded by other artists, including Paul Young, Sixpence None the Richer, and New Zealand artist Stan Walker.

In May 2001, the Australasian Performing Right Association (APRA) ranked "Don't Dream It's Over" second on its list of the Top 100 New Zealand songs of all time and seventh on its list of the Top 100 Australian songs of all time. In January 2018, as part of Triple M's "Ozzest 100", the 'most Australian' songs of all time, "Don't Dream Its Over" was ranked number 65.

Music video
The music video for the song was created by Australian film production company Meaningful Eye Contact and was directed by Alex Proyas. It was filmed in Sydney at an abandoned theatre in Balmain. The video features some surreal special effects such as household objects – including shattering crockery – and film reels that float in the air, with lead singer Finn playing a guitar and walking through the same house during different time periods while his bandmates are either performing household chores or playing various backing instruments. It was nominated for Best Group Video and Best Direction at the 1987 MTV Video Music Awards, and earned the group a Best New Artist award.

Reception
AllMusic described the song as a "majestic ballad".

Cash Box said "The easy going and pretty song camouflages a pained longing. Neil Finn's voice, recognizable from his stint with Split Enz, is reedy and expressive and full of irony."

Track listings
"Don't Dream It's Over", written by Neil Finn. "That's What I Call Love", written by Neil Finn and Paul Hester. All tracks on vinyl, from the album Crowded House except the extended version of "Don't Dream It's Over". All live tracks, recorded on Phil Jupitus Show at BBC GLR, 21 June 1996.

7-inch vinyl
 "Don't Dream It's Over" – 4:03
 "That's What I Call Love" –3:39

12-inch vinyl
 "Don't Dream It's Over" (Extended version) – 6:10 (only in 12-inch vinyl single)
 "Don't Dream It's Over" – 4:03
 "That's What I Call Love" – 3:39

7-inch US vinyl (American Pie label)
 "Don't Dream It's Over" – 4:03
 "Something So Strong" – 2:51

1996 UK CD1
 "Don't Dream It's Over" – 3:53
 "Weather with You" (live) – 4:35
 "Into Temptation" (live) – 4:48
 "Locked Out" (live) – 2:04

1996 UK CD2
 "Don't Dream It's Over" – 3:53
 "Four Seasons in One Day" (live) – 3:08
 "In My Command" (live) – 4:14
 "Pineapple Head" (live) – 3:40

Personnel
 Neil Finn: lead vocals, guitars
 Nick Seymour: bass guitar
 Paul Hester: drums, percussion, backing vocals
 Mitchell Froom: keyboards and organs
 Tim Pierce: guitar

Charts and certifications

Weekly charts

Year-end charts

Certifications

Paul Young version

In 1991, English musician Paul Young covered "Don't Dream It's Over" on his compilation From Time to Time – The Singles Collection. Young's version featured Paul Carrack singing the fourth verse and performing the keyboard and synthesizers.

Track listing
UK 7-inch and cassette single
 "Don't Dream It's Over" (Neil Finn) – 3:56
 "I Need Somebody" (Paul Young) – 4:00

Charts

Sixpence None the Richer version

"Don't Dream It's Over" was the second radio single released in promotion of the album Divine Discontent by Sixpence None the Richer. The commercial single release features the B-side "Don't Pass Me By," which was recorded during the sessions for Divine Discontent.  Their version was also included in the 2003 compilation album Smallville: The Talon Mix.

Track listing
US CD single
 "Don't Dream It's Over" (radio edit) – 3:39
 "Don't Pass Me By" – 3:26

Charts

Release history

Antonello Venditti version
Italian singer-songwriter Antonello Venditti interpreted an adaptation in Italian entitled Alta marea (High tide), inspired by Monte Argentario and recorded for his 1991 album Benvenuti in paradiso (Welcome to Heaven), which remains one of his most remembered songs to this day. A 16-year-old Angelina Jolie appears in the video.

References

1980s ballads
1986 singles
1986 songs
1991 singles
2003 singles
APRA Award winners
ARIA Award winners
Capitol Records singles
Columbia Records singles
Crowded House songs
Number-one singles in New Zealand
Paul Young songs
Reprise Records singles
Rock ballads
RPM Top Singles number-one singles
Sixpence None the Richer songs
Song recordings produced by Dan Hartman
Song recordings produced by Mitchell Froom
Songs written by Neil Finn
Songs about dreams